Yengejeh-ye Reza Beyglu (also Romanized as Yengejeh-ye Reẕā Beyglū; also known as Yengejeh) is a village in Sardabeh Rural District, in the Central District of Ardabil County, Ardabil Province, Iran. At the 2006 census, its population was 403, in 85 families.

References 

Tageo

Towns and villages in Ardabil County